Rossbeevera is a genus of sequestrate (truffle-like) fungi in the family Boletaceae. It was first published in 2012 under the erroneous name Rosbeeva, but was corrected to Rossbeevera in the same issue. The genus was created to contain species formerly placed in Chamonixia, but characterized by having ellipsoid to spindle-shaped spores with 3–5 longitudinal ridges, bluish-green to deep blue fruit body staining reaction, and a thin whitish peridium. The Chinese species R. yunnanensis is the earliest diverging lineage within the genus, and has a close phylogenetic relationship with the bolete genera Turmalinea and Leccinellum. 

The genus name Rossbeevera honours Ross Beever (1946–2010), a New Zealander botanist and mycologist.

References

External links
 iNaturalist World Checklist

Boletaceae
Boletales genera
Taxa described in 2012